Voćin massacre may refer to:
 Voćin massacre, the killing of 43 Croat civilians in Voćin, Croatia in 1991.
 Voćin massacre (1942), the killing of 350 Serb civilians in Voćin, Independent State of Croatia in 1942.